Nicolle Jane Flint (born 15 July 1978) is an Australian politician. She was the member for Boothby in South Australia in the Australian House of Representatives from 2016 to 2022. She is a member of the Liberal Party of Australia and succeeded the previous member, Andrew Southcott, at the 2016 federal election.

Flint announced on 26 February 2021 that she would not contest the 2022 Australian federal election. She gave her valedictory speech on 16 February 2022.

Early political involvement
Flint was a member of the Young Liberal Movement from 2000 to 2002 and joined the Liberal Party in 2007. She was a solicitor and newspaper columnist before entering politics, and also worked as an advisor to Malcolm Turnbull and Brendan Nelson. She also worked for the Australian Chamber of Commerce and Industry. In 2015, Flint co-authored a paper for the Menzies Research Centre entitled "Gender and Politics", calling for more female involvement in the Liberal Party.

Member of Parliament

First term
Flint was elected to the Australian House of Representatives for the seat of Boothby in 2016, replacing retiring MP Andrew Southcott, who had held the seat since 1996. During her first term, Flint raised awareness in Parliament for endometriosis, with the government allocation $2.5 million to researchers for finding new ways of detecting and treating the disease.

In 2017, Flint bought 400 copies of a book published by the Menzies Research Centre, a Liberal Party think tank, spending $5818, more than any other politician spent on publications between July 2017 and June 2018, despite the book being available online for free. During the 2018 Liberal Party leadership spills, Flint was one of 43 party members to sign a petition calling for Prime Minister Malcolm Turnbull to call for a second leadership spill.

2019 election
In April 2018, the Australian Electoral Commission rearranged the electoral boundaries of South Australia to reduce the number of seats from 11 to 10, in accordance with South Australia's shrinking percentage of the Australian population. The changes to the seat of Boothby resulted in Flint's 2016 margin of 3.5% shrinking to 2.8%. After the redistribution, Boothby was the only marginal seat in the state, making it a target for the Australian Labor Party in the 2019 Australian federal election. Flint was also a target of the progressive activist group GetUp, who labelled her South Australia's "most backwards politician". Days before the election, Flint's campaign office was vandalised with offensive graffiti. She faced further harassment during the campaign, with a man cautioned for allegedly stalking her and her office also being egged.

The race was too close to call on the night of the election, but Flint was eventually declared the winner of the election despite a swing against her. Following the election, Flint accused GetUp, Labor and trade union supporters of being responsible for harassment, intimidation and stalking against her during the campaign, and Prime Minister Scott Morrison labelled the actions as misogynistic and bullying.

Hunting and fishing advocacy 

Some of Flint's columns expressed her support for recreational and commercial fishing and hunting. She wrote that Australian cricketer Glenn McGrath should not have apologised for taking and sharing trophy photographs with animals he killed while on safari in Africa. She expressed support for the commercial hunting of saltwater crocodiles in the Northern Territory and described the McGrath controversy as an "opportunity to encourage a debate about the economic, ecological and environmental benefits hunting can bring".

In her maiden speech in the Commonwealth Parliament in 2016, Flint spoke of the challenges faced by Australian farmers, including what she described as "the modern day scourge of environmental and animal activism".

Flint is from Kingston in the south-east of South Australia. Her hometown harbours South Australia's southern rock lobster fishery and other commercial fisheries. In her The Advertiser column Flint supported the prospective culling of long-nosed fur seals. In 2014 she opposed a major expansion of marine parks in South Australia, citing the loss of fishing industry jobs. She claimed that the government had not provided "concrete evidence" showing the need for the parks, and that the industry was already operating sustainably.

Great white sharks 
In 2014, during the Western Australian shark cull, Flint expressed her support for the use of drum lines and shark nets to protect humans from potential attack from great white sharks. In 2017, she expressed her support for the Liberal Federal council's decision to consider permitting the fishing of great white sharks, pending the results of research undertaken by the CSIRO into the status of the species' population. As of 2017, fishing for great white sharks is prohibited as the animals are listed as "vulnerable" under the EPBC Act. She told The Australian: "We must protect our swimmers and surfers and hard-working Australians like abalone divers from being attacked or killed by sharks."

Political views 
Flint is a member of the National Right faction of the Liberal Party.

Before her election Flint's political views were expressed in regular opinion editorial columns in The Advertiser. She has stated that the Labor Party should have done more to prevent the harassment and intimidation she experienced during the 2019 election campaign.

References

1978 births
Living people
Liberal Party of Australia members of the Parliament of Australia
Members of the Australian House of Representatives for Boothby
Members of the Australian House of Representatives
Women members of the Australian House of Representatives
Australian solicitors
Flinders University alumni
21st-century Australian politicians
21st-century Australian women politicians